Omaya Sports Club is a Syrian football club located in province of Idlib in the northwest of Syria.  Omaya SC Played in the second division in Syria and the Syrian Premier League.  The club won the Second Division in Syria many times and was promoted to the Syrian first division League for the first time in 1991.  In 2015, the club announced its withdrawal from the Syrian Premier League because of the Syrian civil war.

Club history 
Omaya Sports Club was founded in 1951, holding the name Arab Brotherhood Club, and remained under this name until the formation of Syrian Sports Association, when Omayya SC was classified to play in the second division league.

Promotion and relegation
The club was promoted to the first division for the first time in 1991 and then returned to the second division league. In the 2001-2002 season, the club was promoted to the first division again, where it remained for four seasons. They were promoted again in 2008 and exhibited a strong performance. In 2015, the club announced its withdrawal from the Syrian league.

Notable players 
The club provided the Syrian National team with quality players who have proven their presence on the scene, like Faysal Tattan who was the most effective player of Hittin Club in the eighties, Hazem Harbah who played for Teshreen Club for many years and was the leading scorer for the club, Ammar Zakour who was the star of Omaya before moving to Iraq and then to Lebanon as a professional player.

2015 squad

External links
  Official website
  Omayya at Kooora.com

Football clubs in Syria
Association football clubs established in 1972
Idlib
1972 establishments in Syria